The 2007 Ulster Senior Hurling Championship was the 59th staging of the Ulster hurling championship since its establishment by the Ulster Council in 1901.

Antrim were the winners.

Bracket

Box scores

References 

Ulster
Hurling
Ulster Senior Hurling Championship